Dupuy, also spelt DuPuy (US spelling), and in its old form du Puy is originally a French surname centered in Aquitaine, dating back to medieval times. Translated, the name means "of a puy", puy being a "height" in Old French. In Aquitaine and in the south of France, it is more generally a frenchification of its original Occitan forms such as Delpech, Delpuech and half frenchified forms (article) Dupech, Dupuch, Dupey. They all share the same meaning and etymology. The surname Dupuis / Du Puis has mostly nothing to do : it is widespread in northern France and means "of the well".

People named du Puy or Dupuy
 Albert Dupuy (born February 1, 1947 in Alicante, Spain), French civil servant
 Alleman du Puy de Montbrun (born 1132), Chevalier, Lord of Perins
 Bob DuPuy, President and Chief Operating Officer of Major League Baseball
 Charles Dupuy (5 November 1851 – 23 July 1923), French statesman and three time Prime Minister of France
 Charlotte Dupuy, African American enslaved by Henry Clay
 Claude Dupuy (bishop) (1901–1989), Archbishop of Albi
 Claude Dupuy (jurist) (1545–1594), Parisian jurist, humanist and bibliophile
 Claude-Thomas Dupuy (1678–1738), Intendant of New France from 1726 to 1728
 Dominique Dupuy (biologist) (1812–1885), French zoologist and botanist
 Dominique Dupuy (1957), race driver
 Eliza Ann Dupuy (ca. 1814 – 1880), American author
 Gérard du Puy (died February 14, 1389), French cardinal of the Roman Catholic Church
 Henri Dupuy de Lôme (15 October 1816 – 1 February 1885), French naval architect
 Hughes du Puy, Knight of DAUPHINY
 Imbert du Puy (died 26 May 1348),  French Cardinal, nephew of Pope John XXII
 Jean Dupuy (disambiguation), various persons
 Jean Baptiste Édouard Du Puy (1770 – April 3, 1822), Swiss-born singer, composer, director and violinist
 Jean-Pierre Dupuy, professor of social and political philosophy
 Kléber Dupuy (1892-1966), French army officer
 Michel Dupuy, Canadian diplomat, journalist, academic and politician from Quebec
 Paul Dupuy, history lecturer at the Ecole Normale
 Philippe Dupuy of Dupuy and Berberian, French cartoonist and co-creator of Monsieur Jean
 Pierre Dupuy (scholar) (1582–1651), a French scholar
 Raymond du Puy de Provence (1083–1160), French knight (Chevalier) and second Grand Master of the Order of St. John of Jerusalem
 Raphael du Puy (1009–1062), Grand Chamberlain to Emperor Konrad II
 Richard Ernest Dupuy (1887-1975), American, journalist, army officer and military historian
 Tina Dupuy, American syndicated political columnist, humorist and writer
 Trevor N. Dupuy, American military historian
 William E. DePuy, (1919-1992) American general

See also
Dupuy (disambiguation)

References

French-language surnames
Surnames of French origin

de:Dupuy